Desirée Annette Weekes (born 30 November 1968), known by her stage name Des'ree, is an English pop recording artist who rose to popularity during the 1990s. She is best known for her hits "Feel So High", "You Gotta Be", "Life", and "Kissing You" (from the soundtrack of the film Romeo + Juliet). At the 1999 Brit Awards she received the Brit Award for Best British female solo artist.

Early life
Des'ree was born in Croydon, South East London, England, on 30 November 1968. Her mother is from British Guiana (now Guyana), and her father is from Barbados. She was introduced to reggae, calypso and jazz music by her parents. At the age of 22, and with no connections in the music industry, she was signed in 1991 to Sony 550 when she asked her boyfriend to send a demo to the label, and they quickly contacted her.

Career 
Des'ree's debut single, "Feel So High", was released in August 1991, a mere 12 weeks after her signing. The single did not initially reach the UK top 40, but hit #13 when it was re-released in January 1992. Her debut album Mind Adventures was released in February 1992. It received good reviews and hit the top 30 in the UK. She spent in 1992 touring as the opening act to Simply Red. In 1993, Des'ree collaborated with Terence Trent D'Arby on the song "Delicate", which was released as a single and hit the UK top 20 and the US top 100. She ended the year singing with a host of other artists at the first concert of secular music at the Vatican City, on 23 December 1993, which was aired on Italian TV. The concert, named Concerto di Natale, has been held with different artists every Christmas in the years since.

In 1994, her single "You Gotta Be" hit the Billboard Hot 100 Top 5, peaking at number 5, and was a hit in the UK three times. "You Gotta Be" became the most played music video on VH1 and remained on the Billboard Recurrent Airplay Chart for 80 weeks. Following the single's success, Des'ree's second album, I Ain't Movin', sold in excess of 2.5 million copies worldwide. Her success led to an American tour with Seal in 1995. The following year, she contributed the song "Kissing You" to the soundtrack of the film William Shakespeare's Romeo + Juliet. She appears in the film singing the song. In 1997, her song "Crazy Maze" was featured on the soundtrack of the movie Nothing to Lose with Martin Lawrence and Tim Robbins. In the same year she provided vocals on "Plenty Lovin'" on Steve Winwood's album Junction Seven.

In 1998, her single "Life" became a hit in Europe, reaching number 1 in many countries, as well as in Japan. In 1999, she won a Brit Award for the British Female Solo Artist category. The album from which the single was taken, Supernatural, was also released in 1998 to mostly positive reviews. It was somewhat successful in the UK, but was a commercial flop in the United States. In 2007, Des'ree also notably won a BBC poll for the "worst lyrics ever" for the single, the offending lyrics being "I don't want to see a ghost/it's the sight that I fear most/I'd rather have a piece of toast/watch the evening news". In 1999, she sang The Beatles' song "Blackbird" at a concert in honour of Linda McCartney. At the concert, she met the group Ladysmith Black Mambazo and she collaborated with them on a cover of "Ain't No Sunshine", which was released in late 1999. After that, Des'ree put her music career on hold to focus on her private life and disappeared from the public eye.

A compilation of rare songs and live tracks, Endangered Species, was released in 2000. In 2001 she contributed vocals to the charity single "Wake Up The Morning", which was released in honour of the death of Damilola Taylor. Billed as Together As One, other contributors to the song were Gabrielle, Andrew Roachford and Courtney Pine. In 2002, she contributed a sung sonnet from William Shakespeare's The Merchant of Venice to the various artists album When Love Speaks. Sony released Dream Soldier in 2003. Only one track from the album was released as a single, "It's Okay", which peaked in the UK at number 69. The single did not chart in the US. The video, directed by Jake Nava, was shot in London's Notting Hill. "Dream Soldier" was not a critical or commercial success. Des'ree was subsequently dropped by her label, Sony/550 Music, following the release of the album in March 2003.

Shortly afterwards, she took a hiatus from music to focus on her interest in naturopathy, also training as a nutritionist. In 2008 she came out of her hiatus to perform at the O2 Arena for Young Voices' "The Big Sing" charity concert. She helped break the record for "most people simultaneously singing the same song" by leading 600,000 schoolchildren across the United Kingdom in singing "You Gotta Be". In 2011, she performed "You Gotta Be" at the wedding for George Medal recipient Paul Jacobs. That same year, she sung a lullaby on naturopath Julie Langton-Smith's sleep therapy CD Sleep Talk Lullaby.

Her first album in sixteen years, titled A Love Story, was released by her own label, Stargazer Records, on 11 October 2019. She had begun work on the album in 2012, but took a break to care for her mother.

Other work
"Silent Hero", written by Des'ree and Prince Sampson, featured in Spike Lee's 1995 film Clockers, "Feel So High", written by Des'ree and Michael Graves, featured in the 1996 film Set It Off, and "You Gotta Be" featured in The Object of My Affection and The Next Karate Kid. In 1997, Des'ree's hit "Feel So High" was interpolated into the Janet Jackson song "Got 'Til It's Gone" from Jackson's CD The Velvet Rope without due credit to Des'ree as a contributor. The maxi single, however, lists Des'ree and Michael Graves as two of the song's writers, after winning a lawsuit against Jackson. She also considered suing Robyn and Cleopatra due to the similarities between their songs ("Show Me Love" and "Life Ain't Easy" respectively) and "Feel So High"; however, nothing came of it. In 1999 she recorded a duet with Ladysmith Black Mambazo on a cover of the Bill Withers song "Ain't No Sunshine".

Awards 
Des'ree has won several awards, including a Brit Award, an Ivor Novello Award, World Music Award, Urban Music Award and a BMI Award for over five million plays of "You Gotta Be" in America alone. Des'ree also won a BBC poll for "Worst Pop Lyricist" for the 1998 single "Life", though it went to number 1 in Japan, Spain and several other European countries.

Personal life
Des'ree is a vegetarian. In 2002, she did short courses in photography and ceramics at the Camberwell College of Arts.

Awards and nominations
BMI London Awards

|-
| 2007
| rowspan=2|"You Gotta Be"
| 4 Million Award
| 
|-
| 2015
| 5 Million Award
| 

BMI Pop Awards

!Ref.
|-
| 1996
| "You Gotta Be"
| Award-Winning Song
| 
| 

Billboard Music Awards

|-
| 1995
| "You Gotta Be"
| Top Adult Contemporary Single
| 

Brit Awards

!Ref.
|-
| 1995
| rowspan=2|Herself
| rowspan=2|British Female Solo Artist
| 
| 
|-
| rowspan="2" | 1999
| 
| rowspan=2|
|-
| "Life"
| British Single of the Year
| 

Ivor Novello Awards

|-
| 1995
| "You Gotta Be"
| Best Contemporary Song
| 
|-
| 1999
| "Life"
| International Hit of the Year
| 

MTV Video Music Awards

|-
| rowspan="2" | 1995
| rowspan="2" | "You Gotta Be"
| Best New Artist
| 
|-
| Best Female Video
| 

RSH Gold Awards

!Ref.
|-
| 1999
| Herself
| Catchy Tune of 1998
| 
|

World Music Awards

|-
| 1999
| Herself
| World's Best Selling British Artist
|

Discography

Albums

Studio albums

Compilation albums

Singles
{| class="wikitable plainrowheaders" style="text-align:center;"
|+ List of singles released, showing selected chart positions and certifications
! scope="col" rowspan="2" style="width:16em;"| Title
! scope="col" rowspan="2"| Year
! scope="col" colspan="8"| Peak chart positions
! scope="col" rowspan="2" style="width:13em;"| Certifications
! scope="col" rowspan="2" style="width:10em;"| Album
|-
! scope="col" style="width:2.5em;font-size:90%;"| UK
! scope="col" style="width:2.5em;font-size:90%;"| AUS
! scope="col" style="width:2.5em;font-size:90%;"| GER
! scope="col" style="width:2.5em;font-size:90%;"| IRE
! scope="col" style="width:2.5em;font-size:90%;"|  ITA
! scope="col" style="width:2.5em;font-size:90%;"| NLD
! scope="col" style="width:2.5em;font-size:90%;"|  SPA
! scope="col" style="width:2.5em;font-size:90%;"| US
|-
! scope="row"| "Feel So High"1
| 1991
| 13
| 28
| 15
| 20
| —
| 25
| —
| 67
|
| rowspan="3"| Mind Adventures
|-
! scope="row"| "Mind Adventures"
| rowspan="2"| 1992
| 43
| 89
| 94
| —
| —
| —
| —
| —
|
|-
! scope="row"| "Why Should I Love You"
| 44
| 102
| —
| —
| —
| —
| —
| —
|
|-
! scope="row"| "You Gotta Be"
| rowspan="3"| 1994
| 14
| 9
| 79
| —
| 15
| 47
| —
| 5
|
 UK: Gold
NZ: Gold
| rowspan="3"| I Ain't Movin'''
|-
! scope="row"| "I Ain't Movin'
| 44
| 59
| —
| —
| —
| —
| —
| —
|
|-
! scope="row"| "Little Child"
| 69
| 210
| —
| —
| —
| —
| —
| —
|
|-
! scope="row"| "I'm Kissing You"
| 1997
| 83
| 17
| —
| —
| —
| —
| —
| —
|
 UK: Silver
| Romeo + Juliet|-
! scope="row"| "Life"
| rowspan="2"| 1998
| 8
| 8
| 8
| 3
| 1
| 1
| 3
| —
|
UK: Silver
AUS: Platinum
| rowspan="3"| Supernatural|-
! scope="row"| "What's Your Sign?"
| 19
| 167
| 65
| —
| —
| 70
| 1
| —
|
|-
! scope="row"| "You Gotta Be" (remix)3
| 1999
| 10
| —
| 76
| —
| —
| 77
| 1
| —
|
|-
! scope="row"| "It's Okay"
| rowspan="2"| 2003
| 69
| 96
| —
| —
| 59
| —
| —
| —
|
| rowspan="2"| Dream Soldier|-
! scope="row"| "Why?"
| —
| —
| —
| —
| —
| —
| —
| —
|
|-
| colspan="12" style="font-size:8pt;"| "—" denotes releases that were not released in that country or did not chart.
|}

Notes
 1 "Feel So High" originally peaked at number 51 in the UK Singles Chart in 1991. It was re-released in 1992 and peaked at number 13. In the US, the single did not chart until 1995 and featured on I Ain't Movin'.
 3 "Fire" was included on the 1998 edition of Supernatural'' as track 11. "You Gotta Be" replaced it when the album was re-released in the UK in 1999, albeit not the 1999 Mix.

As a featured artist

Promotional singles

References

External links
 Official web site
 Des'ree Japan 
 [ Des'ree] from Allmusic
 

1968 births
Living people
English women singer-songwriters
English soul musicians
English contraltos
Neo soul singers
Brit Award winners
Alumni of Camberwell College of Arts
English soul singers
English people of Barbadian descent
English people of Guyanese descent
20th-century Black British women singers
Singers from London
People from Croydon
550 Music artists
S2 Records artists
21st-century Black British women singers
World Music Awards winners